The San Luis Valley Conservation Area is a proposed "landscape scale" National Conservation Area in south-central Colorado and far northern New Mexico which would be administered by the U.S. Fish and Wildlife Service:
The area, comprising the San Luis Valley and the upper basin of the Rio Grande, would become the fifth unit of the San Luis Valley National Wildlife Refuge Complex.
Planning for this conservation area is part of developing the comprehensive conservation plan for the refuges in the San Luis Valley.
After consideration of public comment on the draft plan a portion of the proposed San Luis Valley Conservation Area that has immediate conservation need and opportunities has been identified. This is the proposed Sangre de Cristo Conservation Area.

The proposal was promoted and strongly supported by Ken Salazar, United States Secretary of the Interior in the Obama Administration. Secretary Salazar is a Hispanic San Luis Valley native with a ranching background in Conejos County, Colorado.

Public meetings on the draft proposal were held by the Fish and Wildlife Service in May, 2012 in Alamosa, San Luis, and Moffat, Colorado and comments solicited.

The draft plan focuses on maintaining wetlands and riparian habitats in the high desert mountain valley. The plan has been criticized by the Rio Grande Water Conservation District, which represents local water users, as limiting the flexibility needed to manage agricultural water use in the San Luis Valley needed to balance the water budget.

The proposed conservation area is defined by the headwaters of the Rio Grande, which begins its nearly  journey to the Gulf of Mexico in the San Juan Mountains and Sangre de Cristo Range that surround the San Luis Valley. Runoff from mountain snowpack creates wetlands and riparian areas in the midst of what otherwise is a high-mountain desert, providing important habitat for dozens of species of migratory birds and other sensitive or imperiled species. The surrounding sagebrush shrublands and mountains provide homes and migration corridors for the Rio Grande cutthroat trout, Canada lynx, and important State game species such as elk and deer.

Conservation easement contracts would specify perpetual protection of habitat for trust species and limits on residential, industrial, or commercial development. Contracts would prohibit alteration of the natural topography, conversion of native grassland to cropland, and drainage or filling of wetlands. When appropriate, easement contracts would prevent the sale of surface water rights or change in water use that would have substantial negative effects on the wildlife value of the property. Easement land would remain in private ownership. Therefore, property tax and invasive plant control would remain the responsibility of the landowner, who also would retain control of public access to the land. Contracts would not restrict grazing on easement land.

Notes

External links
Land Protection Plan
"Draft Environmental Assessment and Land Protection Plan San Luis Valley Conservation Area Colorado and New Mexico

San Luis Valley of Colorado